Durdura is a village of Pitamahul gram panchayat of Birmaharajpur subdivision, Subarnapur district, Odisha, India. It is located on the side of the road connecting Birmaharajpur and Rairakhol town. It is located close to the forest area. Baurijore and Mahanadi are flowing near this village.

References

External links 

Orissa Government Portal
Durdura in wikimapia

Villages in Subarnapur district